Liziane Bayer da Costa (born 24 January 1981) is a Brazilian politician and pastor. She has spent her political career representing her home state of Rio Grande do Sul, having served as state representative since 2019.

Personal life
Bayer is a pastor of the Pentecostal church Igreja Internacional da Graça de Deus.

Political career
Bayer was elected to the Legislative Assembly of Rio Grande do Sul in 2015. In the 2018 Brazilian general election Bayer was elected to the federal chamber of deputies from her state.

References

1981 births
Living people
People from Porto Alegre
Brazilian Pentecostal pastors
Members of the International Grace of God Church
Brazilian Socialist Party politicians
Members of the Chamber of Deputies (Brazil) from Rio Grande do Sul
Members of the Legislative Assembly of Rio Grande do Sul
21st-century Brazilian women politicians